Between Love & Desire (literally "Perfectly Betrayed Companion" while 叛 means betray but homophone to 伴) is a 2016 Hong Kong television romance legal drama produced by Au Yiu-hing for TVB, starring Moses Chan, Maggie Shiu and Ben Wong as the main cast. It premiered on Hong Kong's TVB Jade and Malaysia's Astro On Demand on July 4, 2016, airing every Monday to Friday on Hong Kong's TVB Jade and Malaysia's Astro On Demand channels during its 8:30-9:30 pm timeslot, concluding July 29, 2016 with a total of 20 episodes.

The drama centers on the plot of how an unbalance work-personal life can change a person and break apart their family life.

Synopsis
The once mild mannered Hugo Ngo Pak-yin (Moses Chan) is driven to become a lawyer who seeks justice and fairness after witnessing the injustice and prosecution of his father who was falsely framed for a crime he did not commit. However, his quest for perfection in his profession slowly turns him into a power hungry, cold, ruthless and inconsiderate of others, human being. Due to his workaholic behavior, he neglects his marriage and his long suffering wife Rebecca Tsang Bo-lam (Maggie Shiu) no longer sees him as the man she loved and married. When Rebecca reconnects with her childhood friend Patrick Lui Wing-hang (Ben Wong), she finds the courage to finally leave Hugo.

Patrick, who is also a lawyer, but unlike Hugo, is a kind and compassionate person who seeks no gain when he defends his clients. Now a widower, Patrick hopes his long-time friendship with Rebecca will turn romantic when she decides to leave Hugo, since he had always had romantic feelings for her. On the day Rebecca leaves Hugo she is coincidentally attacked, she suspects Hugo is behind this attack. Hugo realizes the wrong of his past and tries to salvage his marriage.

When Hugo's younger brother Fred is falsely accused of rape by a rich man's mistress to hide her infidelity with the man she truly loves. Hugo is reminded of his reasons of becoming a lawyer. Hugo's boss demands he drops his brother's case in order not to offend the rich man. Hugo however, further realizes that his career and power is nothing without loved ones in his life and defies his boss's demand. Hugo goes out of his way to seek justice for his brother and Rebecca soon recognizes Hugo re-becoming the man she once loved.

Cast

Main cast
Moses Chan as Hugo Ngo Pak-yin (敖柏言)
Rebecca Tsang's husband. Ngo Gwan's son and Fred Ngo's older brother. A powerful and ruthless attorney who starts to question his path in life when his wife decides to leave him because of his changing personality. He believes in order to have a perfect life he must succeed in his career. His wife Rebecca starts to despise the person he has become and decides to leave him.
Maggie Shiu as Rebecca Tsang Bo-lam (曾寶琳)
Hugo Ngo's wife. Lau Man-giu's daughter. Patrick Lui's childhood friend. She married her husband before he became a lawyer, when he was a kind and understanding person but starts to despise him when his personality changes due to him being career minded. Seeing her husband is no longer the man she married and once loved, she finds the courage, with the help of Patrick, to leave Hugo. 
Ben Wong as Patrick Lui Wing-hang (呂永恆)
Wong Hiu-ting's widowed husband and Haley Wong's former brother in-law who still looks out for her. Rebecca Tsang's childhood friend who he grew up with in Indonesia and had always had feelings for. He is a lawyer who fights for justice instead of profits. When he sees Rebecca in an unhappy marriage he gives her strength to leave her husband.

Wong, Ngo & Cheng Law firm
Joseph Yeung as Martin Wong Ming (黃銘)
Rachel Kan as Rowena Cheng Yuen-ping (程婉萍)
Ricky Lee as Tommy Leung Shu-fai (梁樹輝)
English Tang as Peter Ng Fong-wing (吳方永)
Leo Tsang as Kenny Lee Man-kee (李敏基)
Patrick Dunn as Scott Siu Hon-wah (蕭漢華)
Mandy Lam as Carmen Chow Yin-yuan (周燕媛)
William Chu as Justin Ma Sai-ting (馬世霆)
Joey Law as Damon Mak Dik-man (麥狄文)
Candy Chang as Cindy Kwong Sin-yee (鄺倩儀)
Cherry Cheung as Vivian Chan Ka-wai (陳嘉惠)
Mikako Leung as Jenny
GoGo Cheung as Cherry Luk Tse-ying (陸子盈)
Deborah Poon as Judy
Lucy Li as Karen

Ngo family
Li Shing-cheong as Ngo Gwan (敖君)
Kitty Lau as Ngo Guen (敖娟)
Chan Wing-chun as Yip Siu-hong (葉兆康)
Lily Li as Lau Man-giu (劉曼嬌)
Brian Chu as Fred Ngo Bak-wang (敖柏泓)

Lui family
Skye Chan as Wong Hiu-ting (王曉晴)
Roxanne Tong as Haley Wong Hiu-yan (王曉欣)

Development and production
Between Love & Desire is producer Au Yiu-hing's first project with TVB.
The costume fitting ceremony was held on September 7, 2015 12:30 pm at Tseung Kwan O TVB City Studio One.
The blessing ceremony was held on October 27, 2015 3:00 pm at Tseung Kwan O TVB City Studio Thirteen.
Filming took place from September till December 2015, entirely on location in Hong Kong.

Viewership ratings

Awards and nominations

References

External links
Between Love & Desire Official TVB website 

TVB dramas
Hong Kong television series
2016 Hong Kong television series debuts
2016 Hong Kong television series endings
2010s Hong Kong television series